Ilario "Ido" Cattaneo (25 July 1905 – 7 June 2000) was an Italian alpine skier bronze medal at FIS Alpine World Ski Championships 1934 (downhill).

See also
 Italy national alpine ski team

References

External links
Skier profile at Skisport365.com

1905 births
2000 deaths
Italian male alpine skiers